Frederick Worsemao Armah Blay a  lawyer, a Ghanaian politician and a member of the Second, Third and Fourth Parliament of the Fourth Republic of Ghana representing the Ellembelle Constituency in the Western Region of Ghana.

Career 
Blay was also appointed to the position of board chairman for the Ghana National Petroleum Corporation (GNPC). In 2021, he was re-appointed by Nana Akufo-Addo as the board chair of GNPC. He is currently the Senior Partner at Blay and Associates. He is also the board chairman and majority shareholder of Western Publications Limited, publishers of the Daily Guide newspaper, the flagship of the Group, Business Guide, News-One and Young Blazers.

Politics 
Blay was a Member of Parliament in Ghana and served as the First Deputy Speaker in the Fourth Parliament of Ghana. He lost his seat in the general elections held on 7 December 2008 to Armah Kofi Buah of the NDC. He was a member of the Convention People's Party (CPP), but resigned to join the New Patriotic Party after being criticized by some CPP stalwarts for not campaigning for the CPP flagbearer Paa Kwesi Nduom, instead endorsing NPP presidential candidate Nana Akufo-Addo. Freddie Blay attended Adisadel College.

After joining the NPP, he stood for and got elected to the post of Vice Chairman of the party in  April 2014. After the party expelled its Chairman Paul Afoko, it appointed Blay as its acting chairman. He stood for and was elected  as substantive Chairman of the party at an NPP party national conference in Koforidua that took place from 7 to 8 July 2018.

In the prelude to the Chairmanship race, a lot of controversy was generated when Blay promised to and eventually bought 275 buses for the 275 constituencies of the party for a purported cost of 11 million dollars. The opposition asked for an investigation. Blay's opponent in the election called it vote-buying. Blay stated that the buses were bought with a loan facility from the Universal Merchant Bank to be run by State Transport Company on the behalf of the NPP's constituencies.

1996, 2000 and 2004 Elections 
Blay was elected as a member of parliament for the Ellembele constituency in the Western region of Ghana in 1996, 2000, and 2004 Ghanaian general elections. He thus represented the constituency in the 2nd, 3rd and 4th parliaments of the 4th republic of Ghana. He stood on the ticket of the Convention Peoples' Party, who then had a political marriage with New patriotic Party (NPP), and as such did not field an NPP candidate in the Ellembele Constituency. In Parliament in 1996, the minority headed by the NPP, chose him as the Second Deputy Speaker, while NDC's Ken Dzirasah was the First.

When the NPP won the 2000 elections, Blay became the First Deputy Speaker, with Dzirasah as the Second. In 2004, the NDC put up Ala Adjetey, the previous speaker for the same position, against the majority NPP's Ebenezer Sekyi-Hughs. This cost Dzirasah and the NDC the Second Deputy Speaker position, which went to NPP's Alhaji Alhassan.

He was first elected in 1996 with 11,674 votes out of the 25,099 valid votes cast representing 30.20% over his opponents Constance Nyamikey-Quaicoe an NDC member who polled 11,663 votes and Abdul Karim Pennah a PNC member who polled 1,762 votes.

He polled 13,722 votes out of the 24,127 valid votes cast representing 56.90%, Kaku Korsah an NDC member who polled 9,554 votes representing 39.60%, Frank Acquah Adamu an NRP member who polled 630 votes representing 2.60% and Abdul Karim Pennah a PNC member who polled 221 votes representing 2.60%.

Blay was elected in 2004 with 18,428 votes out of 34,969 total valid votes cast. This was equivalent to 52.7% of the total valid votes cast. He was elected over Shaibu Chie Issaka of the People's National Convention, Kaku Korsah of the National Democratic Congress and Kyiamah Kaku an independent candidate. These obtained 388 votes, 11,322 votes and 902 votes respectively out of the total valid votes cast. Blay was elected on the ticket of the Convention People's Party.

References

Living people
20th-century Ghanaian lawyers
University of Ghana alumni
1951 births
Place of birth missing (living people)
Ghanaian Roman Catholics
New Patriotic Party politicians
Ghanaian MPs 1997–2001
Ghanaian MPs 2001–2005
Ghanaian MPs 2005–2009
Alumni of Adisadel College
Ghanaian Christians
People from Western Region (Ghana)
21st-century Ghanaian lawyers